Mount Debateable is a rural locality in the North Burnett Region, Queensland, Australia.

Geography 
The Burnett River forms the northern boundary of the locality.

The principal land use is grazing with some irrigated cropping near the Burnett River.

The Gayndah Mundubbera Road passes through the locality from east (Gayndah) to west (Deep Creek).

Despite the name, the Mount Debateable railway station is not in the locality but in Dirnbir north of the river.

History 
The locality takes its name from the mountain, which in turn takes its name from the Mount Debateable pastoral run taken up in 1851 by George Mocatta. Although it is sometimes written as Mount Debatable, in February 1987, the Queensland Place Names Board confirmed the official spelling to be Mount Debateable.

In January 1912, tenders were called to build a state school in Mount Debateable. A new school building was built in 1926 and the school renamed Granite Hill State School. It closed in 1957.

Education 
There are no schools in Mount Debateable. The nearest primary and secondary schools are in neighbouring Gayndah.

References

Further reading 

 

North Burnett Region
Localities in Queensland